The 1946 NCAA Wrestling Championships were the 16th NCAA Wrestling Championships to be held. Oklahoma A&M in Stillwater, Oklahoma hosted the tournament at Gallagher Hall, March 22–23, 1946.

This was the first NCAA Wrestling Championship since 1942. The 1943, 1944, and 1945 meets were cancelled due to WWII.

Oklahoma A&M took home the team championship with 25 points and having two individual champions.

Gerry Leeman of Iowa State Teachers College was named the Outstanding Wrestler.

Team results

Individual finals

References

NCAA Division I Wrestling Championship
Wrestling competitions in the United States
1946 in American sports
NCAA Wrestling Championships